The 1925 Tulsa Golden Hurricane football team represented the University of Tulsa during the 1925 college football season. In their first year under head coach Gus Henderson, the Golden Hurricane compiled a 6–2 record, won the Oklahoma Intercollegiate Conference championship, and outscored their opponents by a total of 128 to 91.

Schedule

References

Tulsa
Tulsa Golden Hurricane football seasons
Tulsa Golden Hurricane football